Polycarpaea caespitosa is a species of plant in the family Caryophyllaceae. It is endemic to Yemen.  Its natural habitats are subtropical or tropical dry forests, subtropical or tropical dry shrubland, and rocky areas.

References

Endemic flora of Socotra
caespitosa
Least concern plants
Taxonomy articles created by Polbot
Taxa named by Isaac Bayley Balfour